Wietlin-Osada  is a village in the administrative district of Gmina Laszki, within Jarosław County, Podkarpackie Voivodeship, in south-eastern Poland.

References

Wietlin-Osada